Kanyana is a village in the southern state of Karnataka, India. It is located in the Bantwal Taluk of Dakshina Kannada district in Karnataka. The majority of the population are Hindus, Catholics and Muslims and the main languages spoken are Tulu, Kannada, Beary, Malayalam and Konkani.

Schools and College
Government Degree College, Kanyana
Government Pu College Kanyana
Shree Saraswathi Vidyalaya English Medium School Kanyana
Sarkari Hiriya Prathamika School
Sarkari Hiriya Prathamika School Bandithadka
Sarkari Hiriya prathamika school Delanthabettu
Bustanul Uloom Arabic School Kanyana
Namaul Islam Arabic School Bandithadka
Shamsul huda Arabic school Kepulagudde
 Najathul Islam Madrasa Settibettu

Religious Places 
Sri Gopalakrishna Temple Banari, Kanyana
Sri Vishnu moorthi temple Delanthabettu, kanyana
Shri Malaraya Daivashthana, Kanyana.
Catholic Church Delanthabettu
Rahmaniya Jumha Masjid Kanyana Bandithadka
Tajul Ulama Town Masjid Kanyana
Thaw masjid kepulagudde

Demographics
As of 2011 India census, number of household are 1465, Kanyana had a  population of 7,650 with 3,771 males and 3,879 females.

Image gallery

See also 
 Mangalore
 Anekallu

Dakshina Kannada 
 Districts of Karnataka

References

External links
 NEAR PLACES
 Mangalore
 Vittal
 Uppala
 Puttur
 Bantwal
 Alike
 Anekallu
 Manjeswar
 Kasaragod://dk.nic.in/
 http://kannada.ownism.com

Villages in Dakshina Kannada district